Sir James Macdonald, 2nd Baronet, GCMG (14 February 1784 – 29 June 1832) was a British politician. He sat in the House of Commons between 1805 and 1832.

Macdonald was born 14 February 1784, the eldest and only surviving son of Sir Archibald Macdonald, a Baron of the Exchequer, by Lady Louisa, the eldest daughter of Granville Leveson-Gower, 1st Marquess of Stafford. With the support of his uncle, George Leveson-Gower, 2nd Marquess of Sutherland (later first duke), Macdonald was first elected to parliament at the by-election for the Tain Burghs in 1805. He then successfully contested the seats of Newcastle-under-Lyme at the general election of 1806, Sutherland at the general election of 1812, the Calne by-election of 1816 (and subsequent elections) and Hampshire at the general election of 1831.

Macdonald's father created a baronet on his retirement in 1813 and on his death in 1826, James inherited the title. Sir James was persuaded to accept the office of Lord High Commissioner of the Ionian Islands, in the hope that the climate of the Mediterranean would improve his poor health. He was appointed to the office on 2 June 1832 and immediately gave up his Hampshire seat in the Commons. He was gazetted a Knight Grand Cross of the Order of St Michael and St George on 22 June, the same day of the subsequent Hampshire by-election. He dined at his father-in-law's at Berkeley Square on 27 June but fell ill the next day and died of cholera on the 29th at Spring Gardens, without having set sail for Corfu or being invested as a knight.

Family
Sir James was married three times.

Firstly. on 5 September 1805 to Elizabeth, daughter of John Sparrow, of Bishton Hall, Staffordshire, no issue.

Secondly. on 10 August 1819 to Lady Sophia Keppel, eldest daughter of William Keppel, 4th Earl of Albemarle.  They had two sons, Archibald Keppel Macdonald (1820–1901) and Granville (1821–1831).  Lady Sophia died on 29 September 1824.

Thirdly, Sir James married on 20 April 1826 Anne Charlotte, daughter of Rev. John Saville Ogle, of Kirkley Hall, Northumberland.

References 

Nichols, John 
Farell, Stephen MACDONALD, James (1784–1832), of East Sheen, Surr. and Woolmer Lodge, nr. Liphook, Hants.

External links 
 

1784 births
1832 deaths
Members of the Parliament of the United Kingdom for Scottish constituencies
Members of the Parliament of the United Kingdom for Newcastle-under-Lyme
UK MPs 1802–1806
UK MPs 1806–1807
UK MPs 1807–1812
UK MPs 1812–1818
UK MPs 1818–1820
UK MPs 1820–1826
UK MPs 1826–1830
UK MPs 1830–1831
UK MPs 1831–1832
Baronets in the Baronetage of the United Kingdom
Knights Grand Cross of the Order of St Michael and St George